Erewash is a county constituency represented in the House of Commons of the UK Parliament since 2015 by Maggie Throup, a Conservative.

Boundaries

1983–1997: The Borough of Erewash wards of Breaston, Cotmanhay, Dale Abbey, Derby Road East, Derby Road West, Draycott, Ilkeston Central, Ilkeston North, Ilkeston South, Kirk Hallam North, Kirk Hallam South, Long Eaton Central, Nottingham Road, Ockbrook and Borrowash, Old Park, Sandiacre North, Sandiacre South, Sawley, Victoria, West Hallam, and Wilsthorpe.

1997–2010: The Borough of Erewash wards of Abbotsford, Breaston, Cotmanhay, Dale Abbey, Derby Road East, Derby Road West, Draycott, Ilkeston Central, Ilkeston North, Ilkeston South, Kirk Hallam North, Kirk Hallam South, Long Eaton Central, Nottingham Road, Ockbrook and Borrowash, Old Park, Sandiacre North, Sandiacre South, Sawley, Victoria, West Hallam, and Wilsthorpe.

2010–present: The Borough of Erewash wards of Abbotsford, Breaston, Cotmanhay, Derby Road East, Derby Road West, Draycott, Hallam Fields, Ilkeston Central, Ilkeston North, Kirk Hallam, Little Hallam, Long Eaton Central, Nottingham Road, Old Park, Sandiacre North, Sandiacre South, Sawley, and Wilsthorpe.

Boundary review
Following their review of parliamentary representation in Derbyshire, the Boundary Commission for England created a Mid Derbyshire constituency. This took electoral wards from the existing Erewash seat, as well as making some minor alterations in neighbouring constituencies.

Constituency profile
The constituency covers most of the borough of Erewash, between the cities of Derby and Nottingham. The largest towns in the constituency are Long Eaton and Ilkeston. The constituency has returned a government MP since its creation. As an area which is neither especially wealthy nor especially poor, Erewash is described by political commentators as a "key marginal seat" in general elections.

Members of Parliament

Elections

Elections in the 2010s

Elections in the 2000s

Elections in the 1990s

Elections in the 1980s

See also
List of parliamentary constituencies in Derbyshire

Notes

References

Borough of Erewash
Parliamentary constituencies in Derbyshire
Constituencies of the Parliament of the United Kingdom established in 1983